Sadanand Namdev Deshmukh is a Marathi language author.  He was awarded with Sahitya Akademi Award in 2004 for his novel Baromas. His other novels include Tahan, Charimera, Bhuiringani.

References

Marathi-language writers
 
People from Buldhana
Living people
Year of birth missing (living people)